{{Speciesbox
| image = Passiflora tripartita kz5.jpg
|image2 =Curuba.jpg
| genus = Passiflora
| species = tripartita
| authority =  (Juss.) Poir. (1811) 
|synonyms =
 Passiflora psilantha (Sodiro) Killip	
 Passiflora tripartita var. tripartita	
 Tacsonia psilantha Sodiro	
 Tacsonia tripartita Juss.
}}Passiflora tripartita also called  curuba, tumbo, curuba de Castilla and tumbo serrano is a species of Passiflora from Peru, Bolivia, Ecuador, Colombia, and Brazil in areas at elevations of 2000 – 3200 meters.

Description

The banana passionfruit is native to the Andean valleys from Venezuela to Bolivia. It was domesticated and cultivated since pre-Columbian times by various cultures of western South America. Today, it is commonly cultivated and its fruit are regularly sold in local markets. The vine is grown in California as an ornamental under the name "soft leaf passionflower". It is grown to some extent in Hawaii, Madeira and the State of Tamil Nadu, India. The fruit is yellow-orange when ripe and contains a sweet edible orange-colored pulp with black seeds.P. tripartita var. mollissima and P. tarminiana were until recently considered to be one species, P. mollissima.

VarietiesPassiflora tripartita var. azuayensisPassiflora tripartita var. mollissimaPassiflora tripartita var. tripartita''

References

External links
 
 

tripartita